Justus Joseph Georg Friedrich Karl Zimmermann (23 August 1803 – 12 June 1877) was a German Protestant theologian. His older brother, Ernst Zimmermann (1786–1832), was also a theologian.

Born in the Hessian city of Darmstadt, He studied philology and theology at the universities of Giessen and Heidelberg, and for several years worked as a teacher in various schools. In 1835 he was named second court chaplain in Darmstadt, then obtained the title of first court chaplain in 1842. From 1847 onward, he served as a member of the consistory, a prelate and ecclesiastical superintendent at the Schlosskirche in Darmstadt.

He was a catalyst towards the development and promotion of the Gustav-Adolf-Verein, a society that is presently known as the "Gustav-Adolf-Werk". It is responsible for taking care of "diaspora duties" of the Evangelical Church in Germany (EKD).

Zimmermann died in Darmstadt at the age of 73.

Selected works 
 Aufruf an die protestantische Welt (1841) – Appeal to the Protestant world.
 Beiträge zur vergleichenden Homiletik Predigten an Gustav-Adolfs-Festen nach Text, Thema und Disposition (1866) – On comparative homiletic sermons at Gustav Adolfs festivals, etc.
 Die christliche Toleranz (1868) – Christian tolerance.

References 

1803 births
1877 deaths
Clergy from Darmstadt
University of Giessen alumni
Heidelberg University alumni
19th-century German Protestant theologians
Writers from Darmstadt